Midlothian East is one of the six wards used to elect members of the Midlothian Council. It elects three Councillors.

Councillors

Election Results

2021 By-election

2017 Election
2017 Midlothian Council election

2014 By-election

2012 Election
2012 Midlothian Council election

2007 Election
2007 Midlothian Council election

References

Wards of Midlothian